Dampatyam is a 1985 Telugu-language drama film, produced by R. V. Krishna Rao under the Anuradha Art Combines banner and directed by A. Kodandarami Reddy. It stars Akkineni Nageswara Rao, Jayasudha  and music composed by Chakravarthy. The film was remade in the Tamil as Thambathyam (1987).

Cast
Akkineni Nageswara Rao as Dr. Satya Murthy 
Jayasudha as Janaki 
Murali Mohan as Inspector Arun Kumar 
Gummadi
Rallapalli
Eeswar Rao 
Raj Varma
Nalinikanth as Nalinikanth 
Suhasini as Dr.  Lalitha 
Tulasi as Aruna 
Rajyalakshmi as Jyothi 
Kalpana Rai as Chipuchitti Venkamma

Crew
Art: Bhaskar Raju
Choreography: Siva Shankar
Story - Dialogues: Satya Murthy
Lyrics: Veturi
Playback: S. P. Balasubrahmanyam, P. Susheela
Music: Chakravarthy 
Editing: S. Navakanth
Cinematography: S. Venkataratnam 
Producer: R. V. Krishna Rao
Screenplay - Director: A. Kodandarami Reddy
Banner: Anuradha Art Combines
Release Date: 12 July 1985

Soundtrack

Music composed by Chakravarthy. Lyrics were written by Veturi. The music was released on AVM Audio Company.

References

External links

Indian drama films
Films directed by A. Kodandarami Reddy
Films scored by K. Chakravarthy
Telugu films remade in other languages
1980s Telugu-language films
1985 drama films
1985 films